Stāmeriena Parish is an administrative unit of Gulbene Municipality, Latvia. The administrative center is Vecstāmeriena.

Towns, villages and settlements of Stāmeriena parish 
 Āboliņi
 Kalniena
 Lāčplēši
 Medņi
 Namsadi
 Putrāni
 Skolas
 Stāmeriena
 Stancmuiža
 Stūrastas
 Vecstāmeriena

See also 
 Stāmeriena Palace

External links 
 

Parishes of Latvia
Gulbene Municipality